Isaac Aboab of Castile (1433 – January 1493), also known as Isaac Aboab II, was a Spanish-Jewish Rabbi, Posek and Torah commentator.

Biography

Born at Toledo, the great great grandson of Isaac Aboab I. He was the pupil and successor of Isaac Campanton, and was called "the last gaon of Castile." After Ferdinand and Isabella issued the decree of expulsion in 1492, he with thirty others of the most respected Jews of the land went to Lisbon in order to negotiate with King John II of Portugal for the reception of his banished coreligionists. He and his companions were allowed to settle under favorable conditions in Porto. He died a few months after the expulsion. His disciple, the chronicler and mathematician Abraham Zacuto, delivered his funeral address. Many of Aboab's disciples attained to great distinction. Of his works the following have appeared in print:

Nehar Pishon, a collection of sermons, Constantinople, 1538
A supercommentary to Naḥmanides' Pentateuch-Commentary, Constantinople, 1525; Venice, 1548, etc.
A supercommentary to the commentary of Rashi on the Pentateuch and a number of rabbinical decisions exist in manuscript.
 A commentary on the Tur cited frequently by the Bait Yosef and recently published in some editions of the Tur.

References

1433 births
1493 deaths
People from Toledo, Spain
15th-century Castilian rabbis
Jews expelled from Spain in 1492
Bible commentators